A bend sinister is a heraldic charge.

Bend Sinister may also refer to:

Bend Sinister (novel), a 1947 novel by Vladimir Nabokov
Bend Sinister (album), a 1986 album by the post-punk group The Fall
Bend Sinister (band), a progressive rock band from British Columbia, Canada
Bend Sinister (EP), a 2007 extended play album by the band of the same name